"Born Too Late" is a song written by Charles Strouse and Fred Tobias and performed by The Poni-Tails. In the UK, the song reached #5 on the UK Singles Chart. In the US, it reached #7 on the Billboard Hot 100 and #11 on the R&B chart in 1958.

The song was arranged by O.B. Masingill.

In media
The song was used in the 1973 movie, That'll Be the Day.

References

1958 songs
1958 singles
Songs written by Fred Tobias
Songs written for films
ABC Records singles
Songs with music by Charles Strouse